is a Japanese word for practice swings used in sports such as baseball, tennis, golf, and in martial arts. Outside Japan, the word is used exclusively for repetitive individual cutting exercises used in Japanese martial arts such as kendo, aikido, iaidō, and kenjutsu. Often a shinai (for kendo), bokken, suburitō, or even tanren bō are used. An iaitō or shinken can also be used, albeit rarely.

Some common types (these can vary between styles):

 holding the weapon with only the left hand (which is supposed to be used as the power hand)

 rapid suburi where you cut on the forward motion and assume jodan on the return motion, feet should glide on the floor. Sometimes called choyaku-men

 incorporating a coordinated jumping like movement with the strike

 strikes with back swings that almost touch ones lower back and forward swings which almost touch the floor

 alternating diagonal strikes, cutting across the opponent's torso, starting with a cut to the left

 strikes to an opponent's forehead

 strikes to an opponent's forehead, starting with forward, then backward.

 alternating strikes to an opponent's forehead, starting with your right-hand side.

Suburi is used as a warm up before actual practice begins, usually done in sets of ten, though sometimes sets of 100 are used (especially with naname-suburi and shomen suburi). Suburi serves to loosen the wrists (naname suburi) and elevate heart rate (haya suburi).

See also
Aikido (Aiki-ken)
Iaidō
Kendo
Kenjutsu

Notes

Japanese martial arts terminology